Yochai Halevi (born 10 May 1982) is an Israeli long jumper and triple jumper.

Halevi is Jewish.  He competed at the 2009 World Championships without reaching the final. His personal best long jump is 7.99 metres, achieved in May 2010 in Tel Aviv. His personal best triple jump is 16.81 metres, achieved in July 2011 in Tel Aviv.

Competition record

See also
List of Israeli records in athletics

References

1982 births
Living people
Israeli male long jumpers
Israeli male triple jumpers
Jewish male athletes (track and field)
Israeli Jews